Caenopithecinae is a subfamily within the extinct primate family Adapidae, found in Europe and northern Africa from the Eocene to the Oligocene.

References

External links
Mikko's Phylogeny Archive

Prehistoric strepsirrhines